The Jubilee Oval was a sporting ground created in 1895 between the Jubilee Exhibition Building and the River Torrens. It was located next to the railway station at the end of the Jubilee Exhibition Railway line, which operated from 1887 to 1927. It incorporated a (banked) cycle racing track, and a new grandstand and seating on the mound were built in 1896.

It was created, in part for the Royal Agricultural and Horticultural Society as a venue for the Royal Adelaide Show, replacing their "Old Exhibition Grounds", which had been home to the Show for fifty years. The Autumn Show was held at the Jubilee Building in May 1895, with the horse events being held on the Oval. In 1896 the first Live Stock Show was held at the new site.

The first sporting contest held on the oval may have been the cricket "friendly" between two Government departments: the Land Titles Office and Treasury in February 1895, using a matting wicket. The following month saw a match between two departments of the South Australian Register, though the condition of the ground was hardly conducive to an enjoyable game, a horse show having been held on the oval a week before. The first race on the cycle track took place in July 1895, and was praised, but very few spectators were present.

The first League football match held on the oval was Norwood v. West Adelaide on 7 May 1898.

This is the only instance as of 2022 where the SANFL premiership was not decided at either Adelaide Oval or Football Park.

The oval was later deemed too small for league football, with the last game there being played on July 16th 1921, with South Adelaide defeating West Adelaide. 

On Saturday 6 October 1923, Australia played China in an association football match at Jubilee Oval in front of a crowd of approximately 9000 people, with the match finishing in a 2-all draw.

The oval was demolished in 1945 to allow for new buildings for the University of Adelaide.

References

External links

Australian rules football grounds
Sports venues in Adelaide
Sports venues completed in 1895
1895 establishments in Australia
Soccer venues in South Australia
Defunct cricket grounds in Australia